The second Solheim Cup golf match took place from 2 October to 4 October 1992 at Dalmahoy Country Club, Edinburgh, Scotland. The European team beat the United States team 11 points to 6, to win the trophy for the first time.

Teams
The US team captain, Kathy Whitworth had to return to the US before the start of the competition following the death of her mother the day the team arrived. LPGA President Alice Miller took over as captain.

Europe
 Mickey Walker (Captain) - England
 Helen Alfredsson - Gothenburg, Sweden
 Laura Davies - Coventry, England
 Florence Descampe - Brussels, Belgium
 Kitrina Douglas - England
 Trish Johnson - Bristol, England
 Liselotte Neumann - Finspang, Sweden
 Alison Nicholas - Gibraltar
 Catrin Nilsmark - Gothenburg, Sweden
 Dale Reid - Ladybank, Scotland
 Pam Wright - Torphins, Scotland

Kathy Whitworth (Captain) - Monahans, Texas
Danielle Ammaccapane - Babylon, New York
Pat Bradley - Westford, Massachusetts
Brandie Burton - San Bernardino, California
Beth Daniel - Charleston, South Carolina
Juli Inkster - Santa Cruz, California
Betsy King - Reading, Pennsylvania
Meg Mallon - Natick, Massachusetts
Dottie Mochrie - Saratoga Springs, New York
Deb Richard - Abbeville, Louisiana
Patty Sheehan - Middlebury, Vermont

Format
A total of 18 points were available. Day 1 was four rounds of foursomes. Day 2 was four rounds of fourballs. The final 10 points were decided in a round of singles matchplay, all ten golfers from each team playing on the final day.

Day one foursomes
Friday, 2 October 1992

Day two fourball
Saturday, 3 October 1992

Day three singles
Sunday, 4 October 1992

Notes and references

External links
1992 Solheim Cup Match Results

Solheim Cup
Golf tournaments in Scotland
International sports competitions in Edinburgh
Solheim Cup
Solheim Cup
Solheim Cup
1990s in Edinburgh